Lake Township is one of fifteen townships in Clinton County, Illinois, USA.  As of the 2010 census, its population was 960 and it contained 394 housing units.  Lake Township was formed from part of Crooked Creek (Brookside) Township.

Geography

Cities, towns, villages
 Hoffman

Unincorporated towns
 Posey
(This list is based on USGS data and may include former settlements.)

Cemeteries
The township contains these five cemeteries: Knolhoff (also known as Rose), Posey, Trinity Lutheran, Wadsworth, and Watts.

Major highways
  Illinois Route 127
  Illinois Route 161

Airports and landing strips
 Twenhafel Field

Lakes
 Bear Lake
 Mossy Lake

Demographics

School districts
 Carlyle Community Unit School District 1

Political districts
 Illinois' 19th congressional district
 State House District 107
 State Senate District 54

References
 
 United States Census Bureau 2007 TIGER/Line Shapefiles
 United States National Atlas

External links
 City-Data.com
 Illinois State Archives

Townships in Clinton County, Illinois
Townships in Illinois